is a 2012 Japanese erotic horror V-cinema release directed by Nozomu Kasagi and starring AV Idol Maria Ozawa. It was described by critics as a low-budget Japanese version of the 1995 American film Species.

Plot

Cast
Maria Ozawa
Marika Minami 
Manami Mizuse 
Namiko
Kazunori Kobayashi 
Tomonori Kouno 
Shigeo Ōsako 
Yuri Akikawa

Release
This feature was released on DVD in Japan as TOKYOスピーシーズ in February 2012.

References

External links
 

2012 horror films
Japanese horror films
2012 films
Erotic horror films
2010s Japanese films